Štalcerji ( or ; previously also Štalcarji) is a settlement in the hills south of the town of Kočevje in southern Slovenia. It was a village inhabited partly by Gottschee Germans. In 1941 at the start of the Second World War its original population was expelled. The area is part of the traditional region of Lower Carniola and is now included in the Southeast Slovenia Statistical Region. It includes the hamlet of Jelenja Vas.

The local church, dedicated to Saint Anthony of Padua, is mentioned in written documents dating to 1526. During the Second World War it was damaged and after the war the ruins were demolished and removed.

References

External links
Štalcerji on Geopedia
Pre–World War II list of oeconyms and family names in Štalcerji

Populated places in the Municipality of Kočevje